This is a list of programs being broadcast by CNN Philippines, airing on VHF terrestrial television station RPN-TV 9 Manila and other RPN stations nationwide, owned and managed by Nine Media Corporation, through the facilities of Radio Philippines Network (RPN). Its local programming includes news and current affairs programs and lifestyle shows produced by various local production outfits.

As part of the partnership between Nine Media and WarnerMedia, CNN Philippines also broadcasts several programming content from CNN International, CNN USA and Cartoon Network.

For the list of the previously aired programs of RPN, check List of programs previously broadcast by Radio Philippines Network.

Current original programming

News
 Balitaan 
  New Day 
 News Night kasama si Pia Hontiveros 
 Newsroom 
 Newsroom Ngayon 
 Newsroom Weekend 
 The Final Word with Rico Hizon 
 Updates 
 Breaking News 
 Happening Now

Business
The Exchange 
Usapang Bilyonaryo

Sports
 Sports Desk *
 V-League

Public service
 Traffic Center

Current affairs
 CNN Philippines Presents 
 Med Talk Health Talk *
 Meet the Millennials 
 Politics as Usual 
 The Source 
 The Story of the Filipino

Infotainment and talk
 Behind the Brand  
 Business Matters  
 Building Bridges 
 CNN Philippines 10 
 CHInoyTV 
 Dear SV 
 Expertalk 
 Get Fit 
 Living Well 
 Philippine Realty TV 
 Thank God It's the Weekend 
 Where to Next? 
 Wholesome Meals, Better Life

Religious
 Favor Church 
 In Touch with Dr. Charles Stanley 
 Oras ng Katotohanan 
 SM Megamall TV Healing Mass with Fr. Mario Sobrejuanite *

Segments
 Billboard*
 Bright Side 
 Check-In
 News That Matters
 The Headlines
 Snippets
 The Scoop*

Current acquired programming

CNN International-provided newscasts
 CNN Newsroom International 
 CNN Newsroom with Michael Holmes (Monday)
 CNN Newsroom with John Vause (Tuesday to Friday)

Stories documentary block (since 2013)
 CNN Freedom Project 
 This is Life with Lisa Ling

Infotainment and lifestyle
 Business Traveller 
 CNN 10 
 Hollywood Express 
 Quest's World of Wonder 
 Vital Signs with Dr. Sanjay Gupta

Current affairs
 Amanpour 
 Anderson Cooper 360° 
 Reliable Sources

Edutainment
 Box Yourself 
 Zoo Clues

Movie blocks
 Silver Screen 

* Rebranded/retained Solar News Channel/9TV carry-overs.

Previously aired on RPN

References

Radio Philippines Network
Radio Philippines Network original programming
 
CNN